F26 may refer to:

Ships 
 , a Mariscal Sucre-class frigate of the Venezuelan Navy
 , a Tribal-class destroyer of the Royal Navy
 , an armed merchant cruiser of the Royal Navy
 , a Type 16 frigate of the Royal Navy
 , a Kasturi-class corvette of the Royal Malaysian Navy

Other uses 
 F-26 (Michigan county highway)
 BMW X4 (F26), a German SUV
 F26A graph, a symmetric graph
 Fluorine-26 (26F), an isotope of fluorine
 Fokker F26, an early Dutch jet airliner design
 Route F26 (Iceland), a highland road in Iceland